Ron Henriksen (born 20 September 1936) is  a former Australian rules footballer who played with Footscray in the Victorian Football League (VFL).

Notes

External links  
 

 

Living people 
1936 births 
Australian rules footballers from Victoria (Australia) 
Western Bulldogs players
Cobden Football Club players